Grundy College was a secondary and post-secondary school that existed in Grundy Center, Iowa, United States, from 1916 to 1934. It was associated with the Christian Reformed Church in North America, and was founded on October 4, 1916 by German speakers within that denomination. Supporters of the college were called on when Dordt College was being formed in northwest Iowa.  As of 1930, Grundy College was divided into (at least) Grundy Academy (a high school), Grundy Junior College, and the Commercial Department.

As noted by William Katerberg, professor of history and curator of Heritage Hall at Calvin University, some within the Christian Reformed Church viewed Grundy College as competition to Calvin College in Grand Rapids:Professor Rooks viewed normal schools and Grundy College as competition not just for Calvin Junior College and its teacher training program, but for the larger dream of a four-year, bachelors degree granting college.

In 1926, the college had a faculty of 10 and an enrollment of 94 students. At that time it had an endowment of $24,000 and property valued at $100,000. Buildings included a main building and a dormitory. The college ceased operation in 1934 after enduring financial downturns caused in part by the conditions of the Great Depression, but also by rivalries with other institutions.

Timeline 
1916 - College founded

1919 - supporting territory proposed to be expanded to include Iowa, Minnesota, Kansas, Nebraska, Colorado, North Dakota and South Dakota.

1929 - Grundy College's thirteenth annual commencement was held June 2, 3, and 4, 1929.

1930 - commencement 28 May 1930

Grundy College's men's dormitory was in use as an apartment building in January, 1960.

Faculty 
President - Bode, W.; professors. - J. Timmerman and D. H. Kromminga

Graduating Classes

1929 graduates 
Ammerman, Andriesen, Balk, Bode, Boonstra, Bos, Cheney, Den Ouden, Dooyema, Fricken, Fritzel, Heerma, Heiberger, Hoefker, Janssen, Joling, Keuning, Ludemann, Main, Memmelaar, Petersen, Roskamp, Scholten, Ulferts, Van Brug, Van Der Wilt, Van Geest, Van Zomeren, Voetberg, Wood

1930 Graduates 
Graduates Grundy Jr. College: Clarence William Bode, Grundy Center; R. Cornelius Bode, Austinville, Ia.; Christian L. Den Ouden, Ripon, Cali.; Jacob Heereman, Grundy Center, Ia.; Lee B. Primus, Wellsburg, Ia.; Willard Riekena, Wellsburg, Ia.; Eldon S. Smoldt, Reinbeck, Ia.; Dewey Tolsma, Pipestone, Minn.; Gerrit VanderWolde, Steen, Minn.

Academy: John Bakker, Pipestone, Minn.; Cornelius J. DeBruyn, Sioux Falls, S. D.; Edward Fikse, Steen, Minn.; Merle Kalemyn, Grundy Center; Jake Karp, Manhattan, Mont.; Charles Kruse, Woden, Ia.; Minnie Rosekamp, Grundy Center; Deane Charlotte Swyters, Steamboat Rock, Ia.; Jacob VanDyken, Jr., Manhattan, Mont.; Ada Vanhuizen, and Frank Ympa, Manhattan, Mont.

Commercial Department: Blanche Anderson (Certificate); Minnie Roskamp, Grundy Center; Dorothy L. Slifer, Grundy Center; Deane Charlotte Swyter, Steamboat Rock; Edward Tiesman, Fulton, Ill.

Alumni 
Bouma, Louis, Rev., former Christian school teacher and pastor in the Christian Reformed Church in North America.

Bouma, Hermina (Van Roekel),  wife of Rev. Louis Bouma.

Bruxvoort, Brandt/Brand, b. 28 March 1900.

De Bruyn, Cornelius, b. 5 May 1912, d. 17 October 2003. Attended Grundy Academy and Grundy Junior College in Gundy Center.

Heerema, Edward.

Hoogland, Anna (Schuurmans Verwolf), b. ??, d. 1946.

Masselink, John.

Masselink, William

Walhof, Anna (Bakker), b. 6 February 1909, near Edgerton MN.

Wybenga, Edward was a minister in the Orthodox Presbyterian Church who attended Grundy College, then graduated from Calvin College in 1930. He later attended Westminster Seminary in Philadelphia. He pastored Orthodox Presbyterian Churches in Iowa, South Dakota, and Oregon, retiring in 1962. He died in 1965.

See also

East Frisians in Grundy County Iowa 
East Friesland Presbyterian Church, Ackley, Iowa USA.

West Friesland Presbyterian Church, Ackley, Iowa USA, organized in 1873 as The Second German Presbyterian Church of Grundy County. It was a Swiss-German congregation. It eventually became part of the United Presbyterian Church in the USA, then later transferred membership into the PCA (Presbyterian Church in America).

Colfax Center Presbyterian Church, Holland Iowa/Colfax Township, Grundy County, Iowa USA

Germans, Grundy County sign partnership agreement

East Frisians in IowaThe largest Eastfriesian settlement at the present time is located in Grundy, Butler, and Hardin counties, Iowa.

North Central Iowa Classis of the Christian Reformed Church 
The North Central Iowa Classis of the Christian Reformed Church was known until 1958 as Classis Ostfriesland or Classis East Friesland.

References 

Grundy Center, Iowa
Defunct private universities and colleges in Iowa
1916 establishments in Iowa
1934 establishments in Iowa
German-language schools
Christian Reformed Church in North America